Tannersville station may refer to:

 Tannersville station (New York), a disused station in Tannersville, New York, which was part of the Ulster and Delaware Railroad
 a station in Tannersville, New York, operated by the Catskill and Tannersville Railway, which was closed in 1918
 Tannersville station (Pennsylvania), a disused station in Tannersville, Pennsylvania